Zdravo Marijo is the tenth studio album by Croatian singer Severina. It was released in 2008. Due to success in Serbia, Severina performed at the Belgrade Arena in front of 17,000 people. The album has caused media interest and a degree of controversy because of its folk-like sound some compared to turbo folk.

Track listing
"Gas gas"
"Pucajte u tamburaše" (Shoot the Tamburica Players)
"Muškarcu samo treba kurva" (A Man Only Needs a Whore)
"Gade" (You Bastard)
"Da nisi možda gej?" (Are You Gay, Perhaps?)
"Ljute cigare" (Strong Cigars)
"Haljinica boje lila" (Little Violet Dress)
"Šta to ona ima što ja nemam" (What Does She Have That I Do Not)
"Tridesete" (Thirties)
"Zdravo Marijo" (Hail Mary)

Tour 
The album was accompanied by a concert tour. The tour started on 29 August 2008 in Karlovac, Croatia, and ended on 20 October 2012 in Frankfurt, Germany.

References

External links

2008 albums
Severina (singer) albums
Hayat Production albums